Justin Baard (born 18 November 1993) is a Namibian cricketer, who played for Namibia in First class, List A and T20 cricket.

References 

1993 births
Living people
Namibian cricketers